George Morton may refer to:

Politicians
 George Morton (born c.1540), MP for Hythe
 George Morton (Labour politician) (born 1940), retired Labour Party politician in the United Kingdom
 George W. Morton (1793–1865), U.S. politician
 Sir George Morton, 1st Baronet (died 1662), English politician
 George Morton (QC) (1870–1953) Scottish advocate

Others
 Shadow Morton (George Morton, 1941–2013), U.S. record producer
 George Morton (American football), American football player
 George Morton (Pilgrim Father) (1585–1624), English puritan separatist
 George Morton (cricketer) (1828–1861), English cricketer
 George Morton (footballer) (1943–2009), English footballer, Inside forward for Rochdale.

See also
 Samuel George Morton (1799–1851), U.S. physician and natural scientist
 George Morton Pitt (1693–1756), British politician and administrator
 George Morton Randall (1841–1918), U.S. soldier
 George Douglas, 13th Earl of Morton (1662–1738), Scottish nobleman and politician
 George Douglas, 16th Earl of Morton (1761–1827)
 George Douglas, 17th Earl of Morton (1789–1858), Scottish Tory politician